Turks in Pakistan are ethnic Turkish people living in Pakistan. These terms are also used to refer to Pakistani-born individuals who are of full or partial Turkish ancestry. Turkish educators in Pakistan are involved with the PakTurk International Schools and Colleges, which has 25 branches in the country. As of 2016, there were over 100 Turkish educators teaching at these schools, and including their families has a population of 400 Turks.

It is more probable, given that most Turkish villages were in the inaccessible mountainous regions at the time of the 1901 census, that the actual number could be as high as around 10,000.

History 
Turkish people started coming to post-colonial Pakistan in any given numbers when the two countries established diplomatic relations following Pakistan's independence, although a number had come even before that. By the late 70s, a number of Turks began to reside in Pakistan to escape the Political violence in Turkey (1976–1980).
Snowar Khan's siblings  from Oguz Khan ancestry settled in Indian continent on muslim land who till this day have roots in newly developed Pakistan linked to Rajput caste

Afghan War (2001-2021)
Numerous Turks in Pakistan were suspected of being affiliated with Afghan insurgent groups such as the Haqqani network during the Afghan war and fought against NATO and Pakistani troops from the Khyber Pakhtunkhwa region.

The Turkish jihadist militant group identifying by the name of Taifatul Mansura ("Victorious Sect") were actively fighting in Waziristan, likely entering from Afghanistan, with a score of them killed by American predator drone strikes. Their commander, Abu Zarr, was killed by the Taliban who described him as "dangerous" and "uncontrollable." Zarr had been previously involved in conflicts in the Caucuses before being killed in Afghanistan. He was described as the leader of Al-Queda's unit in Turkey. 

A few of these were also Turks of German citizenship such as Mounir Chouka. Some of these also brought native Germans converted to Islam and radicalized such as Eric Breininger, who was brought to the Afghan-Pakistani border and was killed in a firefight with Pakistani forces. Another three German citizens, possibly of Turkish ethnicity, were killed in an airstrike launched by the Pakistan Air Force (PAF) in Northern Waziristan in early 2014, which also killed up to thirty-three Uzbek militants.

Pak-Turk schools 
In April 1995, Pak-Turk Maarif schools and colleges were launched and Turkish teachers were hired.

Notable people 
 Abul A'la Maududi, Islamic scholar, Islamist ideologue, Muslim philosopher, jurist, historian, journalist
Adil Murad, is a Pakistani film producer and actor 
Atif Bashir, German-born footballer with a Pakistani father and Turkish mother, playing for the Pakistan national football team
Aleeze Nasser, actress and model
Tipu Sharif, actor and singer-songwriter
Waheed Murad, was a Pakistani film actor, producer and script writer

See also 
 Kurds in Pakistan
 Turk Jamat
 Tanoli

References 

Pakistan
Pakistan
Ethnic groups in Pakistan